Space Travel, Rock 'n' Roll is the seventh and final EP release by English alternative rock band Swervedriver. It was released on 10 February 1998 through Zero Hour, Shock Records, and Sonic Wave Discs record labels. The EP was released with the single format in Australia.

Drummer Jez Hindmarsh's first experimentation with drum looping is showcased on the track "Good Ships". The EP also features an edited version of "99th Dream", the title track of the band's fourth studio album, 99th Dream (1998). The track features  lyrics that quote from the Electric Prunes and the Psychedelic Furs.

Critical reception

Allmusic critic Tim Sendra praised the EP, stating: "The Space Travel, Rock 'n' Roll EP is proof that the band never wavered and was great until the very end." Sendra described the track "Good Ships" as an "impossibly moody space ballad" and compared the country-indebted track "Hate Your Kind" to Steve Miller's "Space Cowboy". Nevertheless, he also felt that the track "Stimulani" is "as close as the band ever got to filler, just simple chords repeated over and over with increasing volume and intensity."

Track listing
All songs are written by Swervedriver.
 "99th Dream (edit)" — 3:41
 "Good Ships" — 4:32
 "Hate Yr Kind" — 4:04
 "Stimulini" — 3:27

Personnel
Swervedriver
Adam Franklin – vocals, guitar
Jimmy Hartridge – guitar
Steve George – bass; engineering (2, 4)
Jez Hindmarsh – drums; engineering (1, 3)

Other personnel
Dick Meaney – engineering (1, 3)
Nick Addison – engineering (1, 3)
Paul Watson – artwork, design
Swervedriver – production

References

External links
 

1998 EPs
Swervedriver EPs
Shock Records EPs